The 2007 Deutsche Tourenwagen Masters was the twenty-first season of premier German touring car championship and also eighth season under the moniker of Deutsche Tourenwagen Masters since the series' resumption in 2000.

Season summary
The season started dramatically with massive crash on opening lap of Hockenheim race. As a result, Tom Kristensen and Alexandre Prémat were forced to sit out races.

The season also included many controversial moments. In Lausitzring, the safety car caught the wrong driver and this shook up race results almost completely. Organizers admitted that Mika Häkkinen deserved the win and Paul di Resta second place, but other drivers were not in the places where they should have been. As a result, half points were awarded and thus race director Roland Bruynseraede was sacked on 31 May 2007.

At Zandvoort, Audi drivers swapped positions in the final straight, giving win to Martin Tomczyk instead of Prémat. Audi boss denied the presence of team orders and instead told that Prémat did the move on his own.

At Barcelona, Häkkinen collided with Martin Tomczyk and Daniel la Rosa with Mattias Ekström. This and couple of other incidents caused that all Audi drivers withdrew from the race with nine laps to go. Häkkinen and la Rosa were excluded from the race (which was meaningless as both drivers retired in the incidents), fined and given 10-place grid penalty for final race of the season.

This was the final season that Vodafone was a front windscreen sponsor as well as Blaupunkt as a front vehicle plate sponsor.

Teams and drivers
The following manufacturers, teams and drivers competed in the 2007 Deutsche Tourenwagen Masters. All teams competed with tyres supplied by Dunlop.

Race calendar and winners

Championship standings

Scoring system
Points are awarded to the top 8 classified finishers.

Drivers' championship

† — Driver retired, but was classified as they completed 90% of the winner's race distance.
• Half points were awarded at EuroSpeedway because of mistakes by race director during the safety car period. (Points were awarded 5-4-3-2.5-2-1.5-1-0.5).

Teams' championship

References

External links

 Official DTM website

Deutsche Tourenwagen Masters seasons
Deutsche Tourenwagen Masters